Gary Moore – The Definitive Montreux Collection is a 2DVD recording of the 1990, 1995, 1997, 1999 and 2001 performances that Gary Moore made at the Montreux Jazz Festival. The first DVD features Gary's live performances at Montreux from 1990 and 1995, while the second DVD features his performances at Montreux from 1997, 1999 and 2001.

In 2010, a bonus CD was included, which features a small collection of the songs from the Live at Montreux performances, featured on the DVD

Performances

 Tracks 1 - 7: Recorded at the Montreux Jazz Festival, 7 July 1990
 Tracks 8 - 18: Recorded at the Montreux Jazz Festival, 16 July 1995

 Tracks 1 - 6: Recorded at the Montreux Jazz Festival, 9 July 1997
 Tracks 7 - 13: Recorded at the Montreux Jazz Festival, 7 July 1999
 Tracks 14 - 21: Recorded at the Montreux Jazz Festival, 6 July 2001

Personnel
Live at Montreux 1990
 Gary Moore - Lead vocals, lead and rhythm guitar
 Don Airey - Keyboards
 Andy Pyle - Bass guitar
 Graham Walker - Drums
 Frank Mead - Alto saxophone, harmonica
 Nick Pentelow - Tenor saxophone
 Nick Payn - Baritone saxophone
 Martin Drover - Trumpet
 Albert Collins (Special guest) Tracks 4 and 6

Live at Montreux 1995

 Gary Moore - Lead vocals, lead and rhythm guitar
 Tommy Eyre - Keyboards
 Nick Payn - Baritone saxophone
 Nick Pentelow - Tenor saxophone
 Andy Pyle - Bass guitar
 Graham Walker - Drums

Live at Montreux 1997
 Gary Moore - Lead vocals, lead and rhythm guitar
 Magnus Fiennes - Keyboards
 Guy Pratt - Bass guitar, backing vocals
 Gary Husband - Drums

Live at Montreux 1999

 Gary Moore - Lead vocals, lead and rhythm guitar
 Vic Martin - Keyboards
 Pete Rees - Bass guitar
 Gary Husband - Drums

Live at Montreux 2001

 Gary Moore - Lead vocals, lead and rhythm guitar
 Vic Martin - Keyboards
 Pete Rees - Bass guitar
 Darrin Mooney - Drums

Gary Moore albums
2007 video albums